Mathilde Johansson was the defending champion, but lost in the semifinals to Romina Oprandi. 
Silvia Soler-Espinosa won the title by defeating Romina Oprandi in the final 2–6, 6–6, ret.

Seeds

Main draw

Finals

Top half

Bottom half

References
 Main Draw
 Qualifying Draw

Allianz Cup - Singles